Les Uns Mais Pas Les Autres is the fourth release by Canadian indie pop group Immaculate Machine.  It includes six French translations of songs from their 2005 full-length album Ones and Zeros.

Track listing
 "Numéro de téléphone" – 3:40 ("Phone Number")
 "Bateau brisé" – 3:35 ("Broken Ship")
 "(Comme tu es) Cynique" – 3:42 ("So Cynical")
 "Sans issue" – 4:37 ("No Way Out")
 "Les Dernières nouvelles" – 4:02 ("Latest Breaking News")
 "Ne pars pas sans nous" – 2:34 ("Don't Leave Without Us")

Personnel
Kathryn Calder – keyboards, vocals
Brooke Gallupe – guitar, vocals
Luke Kozlowski – drums, vocals
Caitlin Gallupe – artwork

References

Immaculate Machine albums
2006 EPs
Mint Records EPs